Cinématon is a 207-hour-long experimental film by French director Gérard Courant. It was the longest film ever released until 2011. Composed over 30 years from 1978 until 2009, it consists of a series of over 3,111 silent vignettes (cinématons), each 3 minutes and 25 seconds long, of various celebrities, artists, journalists and friends of the director, each doing whatever they want for the allotted time. Subjects of the film include directors Barbet Schroeder, Nagisa Oshima, Volker Schlöndorff, Ken Loach, Benjamin Cuq, Youssef Chahine, Wim Wenders, Joseph Losey, Jean-Luc Godard, Samuel Fuller and Terry Gilliam, chess grandmaster Joël Lautier, and actors Roberto Benigni, Stéphane Audran, Julie Delpy and Lesley Chatterley. Gilliam is featured eating a 100-franc note, while Fuller smokes a cigar. Courant's favourite subject was a 7-month-old baby. The film was screened in its then-entirety in Avignon in November 2009 and was screened in Redondo Beach in April 2010.

See also 
List of longest films by running time

References

External links
Cinématon on IMDB
Approx. 900 of the vignettes on YouTube

French avant-garde and experimental films
2009 films
French anthology films
Compilation films
2000s French films